Kálmán Kádas (Kisoroszi, 1908 July 30 – Budapest, 1985 March 17) was a Hungarian engineer, economist, statistician, transport economics author and professor, co-worker of Farkas Heller, doctor of engineering (1974).

Early life and career 
His parents were Sándor Kádas and Gabriella Bentsik. He married in 1943, his wife was Emma Bartha (1908–1990) and they had two sons: István (1946) and Sándor (1948).

Kálmán Kádas completed his elementary schools in Kisoroszi, graduated from the Piarist High School in Vác in 1926, his class teacher was József Öveges. He obtained a degree in Budapest University of Technology and Economics mechanical engineering in Budapest in 1931, with a degree in economic engineering in 1932, and a doctorate in economics in 1936. He received his CSc degree (PhD equivalent) in 1961 at the Hungarian Academy of Sciences (HAS), "High-efficiency types of transport development. Based on his dissertation entitled Reasonable application and research of new technology in transport, he was awarded the title of Candidate of Technical Sciences.

He received the degree DsC of the HAS in 1974. The title of the doctoral dissertation: Some types of technical-economic contexts enhancing the macroeconomic efficiency of transport development and the possibilities of their systematic utilization.

Positions
1933–1948 at the Department of National Economy and Finance of the Technical University (from 1934 to 1948 Royal Hungarian Nádor József University of Technology and Economics) under Farkas Heller, from 1933 as an assistant lecturer, from 1936 as lecturer, from 1943 to 1948 as a university private professor at the department headed by Farkas Heller until the termination of the department.
1938–1949 industrial economics expert of the Central Statistical Office
1949–1955 employee of the Ministry of Transport and Post (KPM)
1955–1976 professor, head of the Department of Transportation Economics at the Technical University of Construction and Transport
1957–1964 dean of the Faculty of Transportation Engineering of the Budapest University of Technology and Economics
1967–1970 deputy rector of the Budapest University of Technology and Economics

Research 
His diverse work in economics covered industrial economics, transport economics, transport statistics, econometrics, and prognostics. After 1945 he was engaged in industrial and transport economics research.

Notable works
 "Statistical analysis of human labor productivity in the Hungarian manufacturing industry". (in Hungarian); Magyar Statisztikai Szemle, 1944. July–August
 Economic issues in transport. University textbook. (in Hungarian); Tankönyvkiadó. Bp., 1958
 Major economic issues in transport. Engineering manual. (in Hungarian); Bp., 1961
Fazekas Ferenc-Kádas Kálmán. Applications of mathematical methods in the transport repair industry. (in Hungarian); Mérnöki Továbbképző Intézet. Bp., 1966
 Acta Oeconomica. 4. 1969 / 1. REVIEWS. Kádas Kálmán: 8th European congress of the regional Science Association
 Statistics. 1–2. (in Hungarian); Tankönyvkiadó. Bp., 1966; 2nd, extended edition, 1972

 Business Economics. (in Hungarian); Tankönyvkiadó. Bp., 1968; 2nd, extended edition, 1971
Technisch-ökonomische Steuerung von Verkehrsabläufen mit Hilfe kybernetischer Systeme. (in German); Göttingen, 1970
Transport Economics. (in Hungarian); university textbook, Tankönyvkiadó. Bp., 1972; 2nd edition, 1976

Society memberships
 1945–1951 general secretary of the Hungarian Economic Society
 1959–1976 vice president of the Hungarian Economic Association
 1948–1951 secretary of the Hungarian Statistical Society
 1963–1985 member of the International Statistical Institute in The Hague
 1969–1985 member of the Environment and Planning editorial board in London
 1970–1985 member of the editorial board of Regional and Urban Economics in Amsterdam
 1972–1985 elected member of the Österreichische Verkehrswissenschaftliche Gesellschaft in Vienna

Sources 
 Acta Oeconomica 5. 1970 / 4. REVIEWS The New Editorial Board of Acta Oeconomic. Kálmán Kádas
 Magyar életrajzi lexikon /K/ Kádas Kálmán (in Hungarian)
Közlekedéstudományi Szemle. 1985/4. Kálmán Kádas
 Magyar Életrajzi Lexikon 1994. Kádas Kálmán
Gazdaság. 1970. 9. Kádas Kálmán
Névpont. 2013. Kálmán Kádas
Statisztikai Szemle. 1985/8. Kálmán Kádas
 Magyar Életrajzi Lexikon. 1000–1990. Kálmán Kádas
 Kozák Péter. Kálmán Kádas
KSH. 2018. Kálmán Kádas
 Műegyetemi évfordulók 2008-ban. Kálmán Kádas

References 

1908 births
1985 deaths
Hungarian statisticians
Academic staff of the Budapest University of Technology and Economics
20th-century Hungarian  economists